Julie Baumann née Rocheleau (born June 17, 1964 in Saint-Jérôme, Quebec) is a Canadian-born Swiss retired athlete specializing in the
100 metres hurdles. She held the national record in this event between 1991 and 2011.

Competition record

Personal bests
Outdoor
 100m hurdles – 12.76 (1991 Winterthur)

Indoor
 50m hurdles – 6.73 (1993 Grenoble)
 60m hurdles – 7.95 (1992 Karlsruhe)

References

External links
 

1964 births
Living people
Swiss female hurdlers
Canadian female hurdlers
Athletes (track and field) at the 1986 Commonwealth Games
Athletes (track and field) at the 1988 Summer Olympics
Athletes (track and field) at the 1996 Summer Olympics
Commonwealth Games competitors for Canada
Olympic track and field athletes of Canada
Olympic athletes of Switzerland
World Athletics Championships athletes for Switzerland
People from Saint-Jérôme
Sportspeople from Quebec
Canadian emigrants to Switzerland
World Athletics Indoor Championships winners